Watercourse Way is the debut album by Chicago progressive rock/new-age band Shadowfax, released in 1976 on Passport Records (and subsequently re-released by Windham Hill in 1985).

Track listing
"The Shape of a Word" (G. E. Stinson) – 7:29
"Linear Dance" (Stinson) – 5:51
"Petite Aubade" (Chuck Greenberg, Stinson) – 5:59
"Book of Hours"  (Doug Maluchnik) – 6:37
"Watercourse Way" (Greenberg, Stinson) – 6:04
"Song for My Brother" (Stinson) – 9:41

Personnel 
Shadowfax
G. E. Stinson – 12-string acoustic guitar, classical guitar, electric guitar, sitar, vocals
Chuck Greenberg – Lyricon, soprano saxophone, flute, oboe, recorder, bass clarinet
Doug Maluchnik – piano, synthesizer, harpsichord
Phil Maggini – double bass, electric bass, bells
Stuart Nevitt – drums, percussion, tabla

References 

Shadowfax (band) albums
1976 debut albums
Windham Hill Records albums